is a railway station on the Tadami Line in the town of Mishima, Ōnuma District, Fukushima Prefecture, Japan, operated by the East Japan Railway Company (JR East).

Lines

Station layout
Aizu-Miyashita Station has two opposed side platforms connected by a level crossing. The station is staffed.

Platforms

History
The station was absorbed into the JR East network upon the privatization of the JNR on 1 April 1987.

Passenger statistics
In fiscal 2017, the station was used by an average of 41 passengers daily (boarding passengers only).

Surrounding area

Mishima Town Hall
Miyashita Post Office
Tadami River bridge viewpoint

See also
 List of railway stations in Japan

References

External links

 JR East station information 

Railway stations in Fukushima Prefecture
Tadami Line
Railway stations in Japan opened in 1941
Stations of East Japan Railway Company
Mishima, Fukushima